Anarchie may refer to:

 Interarchy, a FTP client, formerly named Anarchie 
 Anarchie (album), a 2016 album by SCH

See also
 Anarchy (disambiguation)